Nick Kyrgios defeated Thanasi Kokkinakis in the final, 7–6(7–4), 6–3 to win the boys' singles tennis title at the 2013 Australian Open.

Luke Saville was the reigning champion, but was ineligible to play in junior events.

Seeds

Draw

Finals

Top half

Section 1

Section 2

Bottom half

Section 3

Section 4

External links 
 Main draw

Boys' Singles
Australian Open, 2013 Boys' Singles